Clifford Norwell Marker (June 13, 1903 – July 1972) was a professional football player who played 3 seasons in the National Football League, with the Canton Bulldogs, Frankford Yellow Jackets and the New York Giants. Marker won the 1927 NFL Championship with the Giants.

References

External links

1903 births
1972 deaths
Players of American football from Tacoma, Washington
Canton Bulldogs players
Frankford Yellow Jackets players
New York Giants players
Washington State Cougars football players